Lorn Alexander Macdonald (born 10 September 1992) is a Scottish actor and director. Born in Kirkcaldy, he studied acting at the Royal Conservatoire of Scotland. He is mostly known for starring as Spanner in the 2019 film Beats and as Mark Renton in an acclaimed production of Trainspotting in 2016 at the Citizens Theatre in Glasgow.

He has also appeared at the Citizens Theatre as Orestes in Oresteia This Restless House and Edmund in Long Day's Journey Into Night in 2017, on television in Neverland and World's End.

References

External links 
IMDB entry

21st-century Scottish male actors
Living people
Scottish male stage actors
People from Kirkcaldy
1992 births
Alumni of the Royal Conservatoire of Scotland